This is a list of some of the bird species recorded at the Azibo Reservoir Protected Landscape in Portugal. Birds are listed by their biological order.

Azibo Reservoir Protected Landscape plays an important role in the region because of its location and ecological characteristics. It is a residential and breeding habitat for many bird species, and is also a temporary habitat for migratory species in transit.



Podiciformes

Pelecaniformes

Ciconiiformes

Anseriformes

Accipitriformes

Galliformes

Gruiformes

Charadriiformes
.

Columbiformes

Cuculiformes

Strigiformes

Caprimilgiformes

Apodiformes

Coraciiformes

Piciformes

Passeriformes

See also
 Azibo Reservoir Protected Landscape
 Azibo River
 List of birds of Portugal
 European birds
 Ornithology
 Birdwatching
 Macedo de Cavaleiros Municipality

External links
Avibase - Bird Checklists of the World
Nature Worldwide

Ornithology
Azibo Reservoir
Portugal
Bragança District